Paul Fisher (born 2 June 1962) is a Bermudian sailor. He competed in the Star event at the 1992 Summer Olympics.

References

External links
 

1962 births
Living people
Bermudian male sailors (sport)
Olympic sailors of Bermuda
Sailors at the 1992 Summer Olympics – Star
Place of birth missing (living people)